Major-General Peter Robert Frank Bonnet,  (12 December 1936 – 18 February 2023) was a British Army officer.

Military career
Educated at the Royal Military College of Science, Bonnet was commissioned into the Royal Artillery in 1958. He became commanding officer of 26 Field Regiment Royal Artillery in 1978, Commander Royal Artillery for 2nd Division in 1982 and Director Royal Artillery in 1986. His last appointment was as General Officer Commanding Western District in 1989 before retiring in 1991.

In 1961 he married Sylvia Mary Coy; they had two sons. Bonnet died on 18 February 2023, at the age of 86.

References

 

1936 births
2023 deaths
British Army major generals
Companions of the Order of the Bath
Members of the Order of the British Empire
Royal Artillery officers